The Michigan Townships Association (MTA) is a non-profit organization based in U.S. state of Michigan. It is one of the largest local government associations in the United States. The MTA was formed in 1953 and now claims nearly 99% of Michigan's 1,240 townships as members.

Mission
The MTA's mission is to help township officials govern more effectively and provide improved services to the 4 million plus Michigan township residents. The association provides classes, educational conferences, and publications to aid their members' understanding of statutory duties. The MTA also seeks to influence legislation in Michigan by representing townships before the Michigan Legislature.

History
In 1952, Kalamazoo Township (Kalamazoo Co.) was involved in an annexation battle with the City of Kalamazoo. During that time, Kalamazoo Township Clerk Joe Parisi and other township officials began pondering the foundation of an organization to provide information to townships, as well as impact legislation at the state Capitol.
Parisi spent most of the next year traveling around the state, meeting with township officials, and receiving advice and recommendations about the formation of a Michigan organization for townships. After the trip concluded, the supervisors and clerks of all 16 townships in Kalamazoo County and supervisors from Allegan, Berrien, Calhoun and St. Joseph counties met at the Kalamazoo Township hall. Following much discussion the group decided they would support the effort to organize statewide.

 Temporary officers were elected including Portage Township (now the City of Portage) Clerk Claus Schuring as president, Parisi as secretary, and a steering committee composed of Comstock Township (Kalamazoo Co.) Supervisor Clarence Neal, Alamo Township (Kalamazoo Co.) Trustee Leonard Newton and Cooper Township (Kalamazoo Co.) Treasurer Leon Wagner.

As word of the new organization spread, Parisi began meeting with local and state government officials who agreed to attend a meeting on October 6, 1953, to formally organize the townships association. More than 700 township officials gathered in Lansing to be addressed by Parisi in the main ballroom of the former Olds Hotel, where the group voted unanimously to form the association. At the meeting's conclusion, Redford Township (Wayne Co.) Supervisor Leonard Broquet was elected president, and Governor G. Mennen Williams offered his congratulations and best wishes for the future of the newly formed Michigan Townships Association (MTA).

MTA moved to Lansing in 1957, when Parisi decided not to seek re-election as township clerk and serve as the executive director full-time. During the mid-1960s, MTA experienced a period of phenomenal growth. Because of its achievements in strengthening township government, the Association became more important to township officials and found itself in need of expanding its services. In addition to advocacy, the MTA began offering scheduled training classes and legal information services.

As District Meetings were drawing to a close in 1973, Parisi was stricken with a heart attack. In an effort to ensure the Association ran smoothly in spite of the executive director's absence, Robert R. Robinson, the MTA's legislative director, and the Board of Directors assumed leadership. Eventually, Robinson, a former MTA President and supervisor of Meridian Township (Ingham County), was named MTA's second executive director.
In 1983, John (Jack) M. La Rose became the Association's third executive director. Concurrent with La Rose's appointment, Robinson assumed a newly created full-time position as associate director. La Rose was originally hired in 1978 as executive assistant. He was later made deputy executive director to prepare for Robinson's retirement.

In 1987, the MTA Board approved the purchase of a new office site on almost 10 wooded acres in Delta Charter Township. Due to careful financial planning, the new site and building had a minimal impact on MTA membership contributions. MTA won an Award of Excellence from the American Society of Association Executives for its financial planning for the new headquarters.

Upon La Rose's retirement in 2000, G. Larry Merrill became MTA's fourth executive director. He served as deputy executive director since 1985, but was originally hired in 1980 as director of education. Merrill's focus has been to support the efforts of the MTA board to govern at a strategic, forward-thinking level.
In 2003, MTA celebrated its 50th Anniversary with an open house, special events at its Annual Educational Conference, a fireworks show over Mackinac Island during its Summer Legislative Conference, and burying a time capsule, along with dedication of a garden memorializing the contributions of former executive directors Joe Parisi and Bob Robinson.

Membership
MTA is not a governmental entity but is a 501(c)4 nonprofit, voluntary membership association for Michigan's 1,240 townships. The Association provides services including speaking on behalf of townships to state and federal lawmakers, answering questions on statutory requirements and providing solutions, and offering education programs to build knowledge and skills for township officials.

What townships do
State laws authorize Michigan townships to perform a wide variety of functions in two important categories: mandated and permissive.

Mandated functions are activities that townships are required to perform. The three broadest mandated responsibilities are assessment administration, elections administration and tax collection, which are legally assigned functions of the supervisor, clerk and treasurer, respectively. State laws also specify details for performing these functions.

In addition to these broad mandates, there are other, more narrow state requirements. Procedures for the township's financial administration, such as budgets, accounting, investments and deposits, are closely regulated by the state. Township meetings must comply with Michigan's Open Meetings Act, and township records must be stored and made available in conformance with specific laws, such as the Freedom of Information Act.

Beyond the mandated functions, Michigan townships are authorized to provide a wide variety of services that are generally expected from general purpose governmental entities. Virtually all townships provide fire protection and many also offer law enforcement as well. Parks and recreation programs, public water and sewer services, trash collection and recycling programs, sidewalks and trails, and cemeteries are other common township functions. Townships, as well as other local governments, can provide these services by themselves, or jointly with another entity, and townships can buy from and sell to other governments any function it can produce by itself. In some but not all cases, townships can also contract with private entities to provide programs and services.

Townships have broad powers to enact and enforce ordinances. Zoning ordinances regulate land use, while many other “police power,” non-zoning ordinances control activities that protect the health, safety and general welfare of the community.

A significant difference between townships and cities and villages in Michigan is the general lack of authority in townships to perform maintenance and construction on roads. In most states, townships take care of local roads in their jurisdictions, but Michigan law transferred responsibility for roads to county road commissions and, most recently, provides the option for county boards of commissioners to transfer road responsibility from road commissions to themselves. Under very specific circumstances, larger townships may contract with road commissions to assume road maintenance responsibilities, but only one township has opted to accept road responsibilities to this degree. Townships do not receive gas and weight tax distributions as cities, villages and counties do. It is the county's statutory responsibility to keep roads in a safe condition, but township boards recognize that counties do not have sufficient resources to take care of all the road needs. As a result, townships collectively spent in excess of $160 million on roads in 2010, even though they are not required by law to do so.

The Michigan Constitution and state statutes limit the amount of property tax millage that townships can levy for general township operations. General law townships are allocated at least 1 mill from the constitutionally limited 15/18 mills allocated among townships, the county, public schools and the intermediate school district. Charter townships, like cities, do not share in this allocated millage, but townships chartered by a referendum may levy up to 5 mills. Townships chartered by board resolution after Nov. 22, 1978, must have a vote of the electors authorizing the levy of up to 5 mills. In either case, the 5-mill limit may be increased up to 10 mills with a vote of the electors.

Townships also utilize other sources of revenue to support services. User fees, permits, fines and special assessments on real property are the most frequently used sources.

Townships serve other governmental units by providing tax collection services. To avoid imposing an unnecessary burden on citizens to pay separate property taxes to the township, schools, special assessment districts and the county, Michigan townships provide uniform assessment of property values and collect all property taxes on behalf of the other units of government. Only a very small portion of the taxes collected are retained by the township for its own operating purposes.

Michigan townships, large and small, provide services tailored to meet the needs of their residents. Township officials represent the level of government closest and most responsive to the wishes of the people.

External links
 Homepage of the Michigan Townships Association

References

Non-profit organizations based in Michigan